Pasan is a town and a municipality in Anuppur district in the Indian state of Madhya Pradesh. In pasan municipality area Maa durga mandir jamuna dham is a popular temple in Anuppur district

Demographics
 India census, Pasan had a population of 29,566. Males constitute 53% of the population and females 47%. Pasan has an average literacy rate of 65%, higher than the national average of 59.5%: male literacy is 74%, and female literacy is 55%. In Pasan, 14% of the population is under 6 years of age.

References

Cities and towns in Shahdol district
Shahdol